Caledonia Bridge may refer to:

Grand River Bridge (Ontario), Canada, also known as Caledonia Bridge
Caledonia Bridge (Caledonia, North Dakota), U.S.